Rainer Künkel (born 9 April 1950 in Breidenbach, Hesse) is a German former footballer.

References

External links

1950 births
Living people
People from Marburg-Biedenkopf
Sportspeople from Giessen (region)
German footballers
Association football forwards
KSV Hessen Kassel players
SV Darmstadt 98 players
FC Bayern Munich footballers
1. FC Saarbrücken players
FC Viktoria Köln players
Bundesliga players
2. Bundesliga players
Footballers from Hesse
20th-century German people